The European Association of History Educators (EuroClio) was established in 1992 with the support of the Council of Europe. The NGO works as a European wide facilitator for innovation and progress in history Education. The organisation contributes not only to the development, but also on the actual implementation of regional, national and European long-term projects, which focus on establishing knowledge, experience and expertise in the countries by training and consulting teachers. EuroClio develops teaching materials, builds and maintains professional Networks and acts as advisor to governments, international organisations, NGOs, History Teacher Associations and other Organisations. EuroClio is supported by the Europe for Citizens Programme of the European Union and has, for many years, Official Participatory Status and is part of the EU Stake Holder's Network in Education and Training.

Background

History 
EuroClio was officially founded in 1993, but already in 1992, delegates from Denmark, Switzerland, Belgium, Portugal, Hungary, Estonia, the Netherlands, France, the United Kingdom, Finland, Lithuania, Luxembourg, Sweden and Norway (14 countries), representing 18 history Teachers Associations decided that a European organization was needed to support the learning and teaching of history by sharing and exchanging knowledge and professional experience. EuroClio was founded by Joke van der Leeuw-Roord. The immediate cause for the foundation of such an institute was the collapse of the Iron Curtain in 1989 and the dissolution of the Soviet Union in 1991. These events changed the scope and perspective of history and history education in Europe completely and for many countries, a European dimension in history education suddenly became possible and important for the future. History education is frequently used as a vehicle for political propaganda, hatred and aggression, but now the decision was made to renew contacts between East and West and reinforce a history education that could act as a tool to foster integration, peace and stability in Europe. From 1993 on, EuroClio grew rapidly and today it represents 64 member organizations from 46 (mostly) European countries, connecting 40,000 historians and history educators in primary, secondary and higher educational institutes.

Awards 

EuroClio received the following international recognition:
 In 2014, the EuroClio programme "Sharing History, Cultural Dialogues" has been awarded the Grand Prize in Contest for The Best Projects of Cross-Border Cooperation in the category Education by the Congress of initiatives in Eastern Europe in Lublin.
 In 2012, the EuroClio programme “Historiana – Your Portal to the Past” has been awarded the Special Prize for European Collaboration in the creation of Educational Media by the MEDEA Awards. 
 In 2011, EuroClio received Honorable Mention for the Intercultural Innovation Award. 
 In 2011, the EuroClio programme “Historiana – Your Portal to the Past” has been awarded the World Aware Education Award by the North-South Centre of the Council of Europe.  
 In 2009, EuroClio received in Brussels the Second Prize of European Economic and Social Council Award for Organised Civil Society by the European Economic and Social Committee (EESC).

The organisation

Mission  

The organization supports the development of responsible and innovative history, heritage and citizenship education by promoting critical thinking, mutual respect, peace, stability and democracy.

EuroClio focuses on three target areas:
 Intense professional capacity building and knowledge exchange, with a focus on the development of innovative and responsible high-quality teaching professionals and the development and implementation of contemporary, class-room applicable teaching materials.
  Dialogue, national, cross-community and trans-border networking and dissemination of information with the goal of maintaining and extending this network through all means available.
 Developing participatory and sustainable, professional civil society networks by establishing and empowering independent History Educators Associations in all European countries and beyond. These organisations act as multipliers of the EuroClio work on national levels.

Member Organisations 

EuroClio has member organizations from Albania, Armenia, Azerbaijan, Austria, Bosnia-Herzegovina, Bulgaria, Croatia, Cyprus, Czech Republic, Denmark, Estonia, England, Finland, France, Germany, Georgia, Hungary, Iceland, Ireland, Israel, Italy, Kyrgyzstan, Kosovo, Lebanon Lithuania, Latvia, Luxembourg, Macedonia, Malta, Moldova, Montenegro, Netherlands, Northern Ireland, Norway, Poland, Portugal, Rumania, Russia, Scotland, Serbia, Slovakia, Slovenia, Spain, Switzerland, Turkey and Ukraine. A full overview of member organisations is available on the EuroClio website

Secretariat 

The EuroClio secretariat is located in The Hague, Netherlands. The secretariat is managed by Acting Executive Director Steven Stegers.

Association Board 

EuroClio is governed by an international volunteer board that is elected annually by the general assembly. Since its foundation in 1992, EuroClio has had board members from Belgium, Cyprus, Denmark, Germany, Greece, Hungary, Iceland, Italy, Latvia, the Netherlands, Norway, Switzerland, Turkey, Macedonia, Portugal, Slovenia, Ukraine, and the United Kingdom.

Honorary Board 

The EuroClio Honorary Board consists of notable scholars and individuals who are prominent in public life and academic circles, including several former heads of state. They allow themselves to be listed as EuroClio Honorary Board Members as a token of their recognition of EuroClio's work and mission.

Honorary board members include:

 Andre Azoulay, Counsellor to His Majesty the King of Morocco and president of the Anna Lindh Foundation
 Antoon de Baets, Founder and Coordinator of the Network of Concerned Historians.
 Judith Belifante, Former Director of the Jewish Museum Amsterdam and former member of the Dutch Parliament
 Hans Blom, Former Director of the Netherlands Institute for War Documentation (NIOD)
 Bodo von Borries, Professor Emeritus of Education, University of Hamburg
 Youk Chhang, Executive Director of the Documentation Center of Cambodia (DC-Cam)
 Diogo Sassetti Ramada Curto, Vasco da Gama Professor of History, European University Institute
 Massoud Daher, Professor of History, Lebanese University
 Norman Davies, Historian noted for his publications on the history of Europe, Poland and the United Kingdom.
 Tom Devine, Senior Research Professor in History and Director of the Scottish Centre of Diaspora Studies, The University of Edinburgh
 Paul Ginsborg, Professor of Contemporary European History, University of Florence
 Şükrü Hanioğlu, Professor of late Ottoman history in the Department of Near Eastern Studies, Princeton University
 Judith Herrin, Research Fellow, Department of Late Antique and Byzantine Studies, King's College London
 Ekmeleddin İhsanoğlu, Secretary-General, Organisation of the Islamic Conference (OIC)
 Yudhisthir Raj Isar, Professor of Cultural Policy Studies, The American University of Paris
 Bernard Eric Jensen, Professor of History Didactics and the Uses of History at the Department of Culture and Identity at Roskilde University
 Gunnar Karlsson, Professor of History, University of Iceland
 Wim Kok, President of the Club of Madrid, Former Prime Minister of the Netherlands (1994-2002)
 Mart Laar, Historian and a founding member of the Foundation for the Investigation of Communist Crimes and Former Prime Minister of Estonia (1992-1999; 1999-2002)
 Margaret MacMillan, Historian, Fifth Warden of St Antony's College, University of Oxford, publications include "Peacemakers: the Paris Conference of 1919" and "The Uses and Abuses of History"
 Mark Mazower, Historian, Ira D. Wallach Professor of World Order Studies, Columbia University
 Anthony Molho, Global Distinguished Professor, Center of Mediterranean Studies, New York
 Josze Pirjevec, Professor of History of Slavic nations, Faculty of Humanities, University of Primorska, Slovenia
 Peter Seixas, Professor in the Department of Curriculum and Pedagogy, University of British Columbia and Fellow of the Royal Society of Canada
 Vaira Vīķe-Freiberga, Former President of Latvia
 Thomas de Waal, Historian, Senior associate in the Russia and Eurasia Program at the Carnegie Endowment

Affiliations 

EuroClio is an affiliate of the following networks:
 LLLP, Lifelong Learning Platform.
 Council of Europe iNGO forum.
 Europeana Network.

EuroClio is an official partner of UNESCO.

Activities

Teacher Training and Conferences 

Each year, EuroClio organises an International Training and Development Course where, on average, History Educators from more than 35 countries meet, learn and discuss a variety of topics and good practice to broaden their perspectives. These Annual Conferences take place in different countries and in close co-operation with local History Teachers’ Associations. In 2009, the Conference was in Nicosia, Cyprus, on the theme “Taking the Perspective of the Others: Intercultural Dialogue and History Teaching”. This Conference is co-organised by nine Teacher Unions and History Educators’ Associations from across the divide.

All EuroClio Teacher Training activities are in close co-operation with both local academics and institutes for history teacher education, and international experts to train history teachers how to use the most modern teaching methods in their classes. For example: history educators everywhere recognise the importance of ICT as a learning and communications tool, and want further training in how to develop these areas and how to extend their skills in using ICT to promote historical understanding and learning. EuroClio operates through the medium of English for international work, and in home languages with translations for the experts supporting projects and in developmental work.

Since its foundation, EuroClio has organised more than 30 International Conferences and more than 70 National and Regional Training and Development Courses.

Programmes 

EuroClio implements several long term programmes:
 International Trainings provides cross-border professional capacity building for history, heritage and citizenship educators related to innovative and responsible history education.
 Historiana - Your Portal to the Past promotes digital literacy through history, heritage and citizenship education by means of an on-line multimedia tool, offering students multi-perspective, cross-border and comparative historical resources supplementing their national history teaching tools.
 History that Connects in the Western Balkans restores the professional relations between history, heritage and citizenship educators and explores opportunities for a collaborative approach to teaching history in the region, including sensitive and controversial issues.
 Mediterranean Dialogues enables educators across the Euro-Mediterranean region to open a common dialogue, to share experiences and to develop cross-community and cross-border cooperation and networks.
 Innovating History Education in the Black Sea Region raises awareness in this region for approaches in history, heritage and citizenship education, which enhance democracy and intercultural dialogue and is creating sustainable national and cross border networks.

Publications

Teaching Materials
Once Upon A Time ... We Lived Together: Joint Work in a Multiperspective Approach, published in 2014 in 
Albanian
, Bosnian, Croatian, English, Macedonian, Montenegrin, Serbian and Slovenian.
 Innovative History Education – Exemplar Activities, published in 2012 in Turkish (summary in English).
 How We Lived Together in Georgia in the 20th Century, published in 2011 in Georgian and Russian (Summary in English)
 Fair and Balanced History, published in Bulgarian in 2009
 Ordinary People in an Extraordinary Country. Every Day Life in Bosnia and Herzegovina, Croatia  and Serbia between East and West 1945‐1990, published in Bosnian, Croatian, English  and Serbian in 2008.
 Retelling the History of a New Nation, published in Albanian, English  and Macedonian in 2007.
 Teaching Approaches and History. Mythological Guidebook for Students and Starting Teachers, published in Romanian in 2006.
 Mosaic of Cultures Textbook and Teacher Manual, published in Russian in 2005.
 History is not only Past, the Past is not yet History, published in Estonian in 2004.
 1901‐1938, The period seen through the eyes of an individual, published in Ukrainian in 2004.
 We in Latvia. Six Themes, published in Latvian in 2004.
 Change and Continuity in Every day Life in Albania, Bulgaria and Macedonia 1945‐2000, published in English in 2003.
 New Ways to the Past: Search, Versions, and Approaches, published in Estonian and Latvian in 2000.
 Methodological Guide, Difficult roads to democracy, Illusions and disappointments in the 1960s, the postwar decade, published in Russian in 1999.

Publications on History Education

 History and Citizenship Education in North Africa and the Middle East, published in English in 2012.
 Georgia: Uncovering Diversity in History, published in English in 2012.
 Korea and its Neighbours, published in English in 2011.
 Bulgaria: European Dialogues, published in English in 2009.
 Former Yugoslavia Five Years of Projects, published in English in 2009.
 Abkhazia-Georgia, Too much Amnesia – Too much Memory, published in English in 2005.
 Moldova. An Undesired Past, published in English in 2002.

External links 

 EuroClio website

History organizations
International educational organizations
International organisations based in the Netherlands
1992 establishments in Europe
Organizations established in 1992